Free Willy is a media franchise from Warner Bros. that started with the 1993 film Free Willy that went on to become a sleeper hit at the box office. The original series primarily follows a street kid named Jesse who befriends an orca named Willy and eventually develops a strong connection. While trying to juggle his newly found life, he and Willy are challenged with overcoming or defeating various hazards to the ocean or Willy himself including corporate greed, hunters, poachers and oil disasters.

Following the success of Free Willy, it was followed by an animated series, two sequels and a direct-to-video reboot.

Films

Free Willy (1993) 

A delinquent orphan named Jesse is forced to clean up graffiti at the Northwest Adventure Park as part of his probation while staying with new foster parents. There, he becomes attached to a captive killer whale, the film's eponymous "Willy", until he discovers a secret from the park's greedy owner that threatens their friendship.

Free Willy 2: The Adventure Home (1995) 

Two years after setting him free, Jesse reunites with Willy during a camping trip in the San Juan Islands with the Greenwoods and newly-discovered half-brother named Elvis as the teenager tries to help Willy and his siblings Luna and Littlespot return to their mother Catspaw after an oil spill separated them in addition to endangering Luna.

Free Willy 3: The Rescue (1997) 

Jesse now works with his old friend Randolph at an orca institute where he tracks down Willy and his mate Nicky, and also teams up with Max to stop the latter's father from hunting the whales.

Free Willy: Escape from Pirate's Cove (2010) 

Kirra discovers a baby killer whale washed ashore in the lagoon near her grandfather's rundown seaside amusement park in South Africa. She names the orca Willy and embarks on a quest to lead him back to his pod before he's sold.

Television

Free Willy (1994–1995)

Cast and crew

Cast

Crew

Reception

Box office performance

Critical and public response

References

External links 
 
 
 
 

Film series introduced in 1993
Adventure film series
Children's film series
English-language films
Film franchises
American film series
Fictional orcas
Amusement parks in fiction
Warner Bros. films
Warner Bros. Pictures franchises